The Mainichi Film Award for Best Music is a film award given at the Mainichi Film Awards.

Award Winners

References

Music
Awards established in 1946
1946 establishments in Japan
Lists of films by award
Film music awards